The Pragati Superfast Express is a daily Intercity Express train plying between Pune and Mumbai via . It is operated by the Central Railways, a zonal railway under the larger Indian Railways. Currently, it plies the distance of 187 km in 3 hours and 25 minutes.

Coaches

The Pragati Express currently has 2 AC Chair Car, 5 General Second Class, 5 General Second Class coaches reserved for Pass Holders, 1 Ladies coach and 2 Sleeper coaches. As is customary with Indian Railways, coaches are added/removed as per the demand.

Starting November 2018, the Pragati Express has received major upgrades in terms of Uttakristha interiors and a new color scheme. Soon it will be attached LHB coach.

Currently running with upgraded Utkrisht coaches.

Service

It was inaugurated on 27 December 1991 as an alternative to the most popular train on this sector the Deccan Queen. It is one of the six point-to-point express trains meant for intercity travel between Mumbai and Pune that carry thousands of regular commuters. The other five being the Sinhagad Express, Deccan Queen, Deccan Express, Indrayani Express and the Intercity Express. Although all trains have the same livery, the Pragati Express takes a different route. Thus it completely bypasses the Karjat–– section of the Central Line.

Timing

The Pune–Mumbai Pragati Express Express is the 3rd of 6 dedicated trains to leave Pune Junction for Mumbai CST & is the 2nd-last train to return.

12126 Pune–Mumbai Pragati Express leaves Pune Junction every day at 07:50 hrs IST and reaches Mumbai CST at 11:15 hrs IST.

On return, the 12125 Mumbai–Pune Pragati Express leaves Mumbai CST every day at 16:25 hrs IST and reaches Pune Junction at 19:50 hrs IST.

Traction

When the train was introduced, it was hauled by WCM 2/3/5 DC locomotives as the route between Mumbai and Pune was under 1500 V DC. Post 2014, after conversion of DC to AC on Central Line, it has been hauled occasionally by Bhusawal-based WAP-4/WAM-4 or Ajni-based WAP-7.

At , it gets two or three WAG-7 or WCAM-3 bankers of Kalyan shed to push the train on the ghat section between Karjat railway station and Lonavala railway station, where the gradient is 1 in 40.

Gallery

Sister trains
 Dedicated Mumbai–Pune Intercity trains:

See also
 Mumbai–Pune Passenger

References

External links 
 Website of the Indian Railways
 Pragati Express route map

Transport in Pune
Transport in Mumbai
Mumbai–Pune trains
Express trains in India
Rail transport in Maharashtra
Railway services introduced in 1991
Named passenger trains of India